Patriarch Callistus of Constantinople may refer to:

 Callistus I of Constantinople, Ecumenical Patriarch in 1350–1354 and 1355–1363
 Callistus II of Constantinople, Ecumenical Patriarch in 1397